In enzymology, an UDP-glucose—glycoprotein glucose phosphotransferase is an enzyme that catalyzes the chemical reaction

UDP-glucose + glycoprotein D-mannose  UMP + glycoprotein 6-(D-glucose-1-phospho)-D-mannose

Thus, the two substrates of this enzyme are UDP-glucose and glycoprotein D-mannose, whereas its two products are UMP and glycoprotein 6-(D-glucose-1-phospho)-D-mannose.

This enzyme belongs to the family of transferases, specifically those transferring non-standard substituted phosphate groups.  The systematic name of this enzyme class is UDP-glucose:glycoprotein-D-mannose glucosephosphotransferase. Other names in common use include UDP-glucose:glycoprotein glucose-1-phosphotransferase, GlcPTase, Glc-phosphotransferase, and uridine diphosphoglucose-glycoprotein glucose-1-phosphotransferase.

References

 

EC 2.7.8
Enzymes of unknown structure